Pavel Drančák (born 18 August 1988) is a Czech badminton player.

Achievements

BWF International Challenge/Series 
Men's doubles

  BWF International Challenge tournament
  BWF International Series tournament
  BWF Future Series tournament

References

External links 
 

1988 births
Living people
Czech male badminton players